Masterpieces: The Best Science Fiction of the Century (2001) is a science fiction anthology edited by American writer Orson Scott Card.  It contains twenty-six stories by different writers.

Contents 
The stories in this book are:

The Golden Age 

Call me Joe" by Poul Anderson (1957) 
"All You Zombies—" by Robert A. Heinlein (1958)
"Tunesmith" by  Lloyd Biggle, Jr. (1957)
"A Saucer of Loneliness" by  Theodore Sturgeon (1953)
"Robot Dreams" by  Isaac Asimov (1986)
"Devolution" by Edmond Hamilton  (1936)
"The Nine Billion Names of God" by Arthur C. Clarke (1953)
"A Work of Art" by James Blish (1956)
"Dark They Were, and Golden-Eyed by Ray Bradbury (1949)

The New Wave 
 
""Repent, Harlequin!" Said the Ticktockman by Harlan Ellison (1965)
"Eurema's Dam" by R.A. Lafferty (1972)
"Passengers" by Robert Silverberg (1968)
"The Tunnel under the World" by Frederik Pohl (1955)
"Who Can Replace a Man?" by Brian W. Aldiss (1958)
"The Ones Who Walk Away From Omelas" by Ursula K. Le Guin (1973)
"Inconstant Moon" by Larry Niven (1973)

The Media Generation 
 
"Sandkings" by George R.R. Martin (1979)
"The Road Not Taken" by Harry Turtledove (1985)
 "Dogfight" by William Gibson and Michael Swanwick (1985)
"Face Value" by Karen Joy Fowler (1986)
"Pots" by C. J. Cherryh (1985)
"Snow" by John Crowley (1985)
"Rat" by James Patrick Kelly (1986)
"Bears Discover Fire" (1990) by Terry Bisson
"A Clean Escape" by John Kessel (1986)
Tourists" by Lisa Goldstein (1985)
"One" by George Alec Effinger (1995)

2001 anthologies
Science fiction anthologies
Ace Books books